The 2002–03 Hong Kong First Division League season was the 91st since its establishment.

League table

References
 2002–03 Hong Kong First Division table (RSSSF)

Hong Kong First Division League seasons
Hong Kong First Division League, 2002-03
First Division